Deja Vu is a 2013 Taiwanese romance drama series created by Sanlih. It stars Yao Yuan Hao and Mandy Wei in the lead roles, with Wang Si Ping and Yang Zhen as second leads. The Chinese title of the drama literally translates to "return to past love". Filming began on 12 October 2013 and ended on 8 March 2014. The first episode aired on Sanlih's TTV channel on 3 November 2013, taking over Love Around'''s time slot. The final episode aired on 30 March 2014, with 22 episodes in total.

Summary
Xu Hai Lin is a talented ballerina. She meets Lu Xi Wei, a wealthy businessman, when she saves his life from a fire. She looks after him during his recovery, and the two fall in love; Xi Wei proposes marriage. Hai Lin's life couldn't be happier, as she is about to marry the man she loves, and she finds out she's pregnant with his child. However, a car crash kills her fiancé, and causes her to miscarry. While contemplating suicide, she meets a mysterious man who offers to give Hai Lin a second chance by allowing her to go back when she first met Xi Wei. Wanting to bring her beloved back, she takes the offer, but because things do not happen exactly as they did the first time she saved Xi Wei, he ends up falling in love with her older half-sister.

Hai Lin tries numerous ways to get Xi Wei to fall in love with her again, but it always ends in heartbreak for her. Until Xi Wei encounters a setback, Hai Lin is the only one still by his side. Only then does he realize her love for him. Xi Wei falls for Hai Lin once more, and the couple is set to be married again, when this time it is Hai Lin who dies from an accident. Xi Wei also meets the mysterious stranger and receives an offer to bring Hai Lin back to life. The two are finally married, but in order to get Hai Lin back, Xi Wei has to give up years of his life and is thus aged.

Cast and characters
Main
 Mandy Wei 魏蔓 as Xu Hai Lin 徐海琳
 Yao Yuan Hao 姚元浩 as Lu Xi Wei 陸希唯
 Jenna Wang 王思平 as Xu You Xi 徐又熙
 Nylon Chen 陳乃榮 as Fang Qi Xiang
 Yang Zhen 楊鎮 as Lu Xiang Kai 陸向凱

Supporting
 Guan Jin Zong 管謹宗 as Lu Bai Feng 陸百峰
 Chen You Fang 陳幼芳 as Lin Yu Hua 林玉華
 Fu Lei 傅雷 as Xu Zhen Ji 徐振基
 Chien Te-men 乾德門 as Lu Da Qi 陸大器
 Lin Xiu Jun 林秀君 as Wang Mei Hui 王惠美
 Zhang Xi En 張熙恩 as Liu Fei Fei 劉菲菲
 Wang Jia Liang 王家梁 as Zheng Ya Li 鄭亞力
 Paul Hsu 許騰方 as Tony
 Mei Xian Zhi 梅賢治 as Xiao Q 小Q
 Yao Dai Wei 姚黛瑋 as Qiao Qi 喬琪
 Chen Ruo Ping 陳若萍 as Fang Ruo Mei 方若梅

Soundtrack

The Deja Vu Original TV Soundtrack (OST) (回到愛以前 電視情歌合輯), which contains fourteen songs performed by various artists, was released on 17 January 2014 under Universal Music (TW). The opening theme is track 1, "Beautiful 美麗" by Dawen Wang 王大文, while the closing theme is track 2, "Let's Not Be Friends After Breaking Up 分手後不要做朋友" by Rachel Liang 梁文音.

Track listing

BroadcastDeja Vu originally aired on TTV on 3 November 2013.

Episode ratingsDeja Vu premiered with weak ratings, coming in last in its time slot. Beginning with episode two, it ranked in first place in its time slot, through to the final episode. A viewer survey was conducted by AGB Nielsen, with an audience survey range starting at four years of age.

Awards and nominations

Remake
 Thailand: Deja Vu / Ruk Yon Welah, เดจาวู'' OneHD31 (2020)

References

External links
 SET Official blog
 TTV Official website
 Official Facebook page

Taiwanese drama television series
2013 in Taiwanese television
2013 Taiwanese television series debuts
2014 Taiwanese television series endings
Taiwanese romance television series
Sanlih E-Television original programming